Dennis Joe Quinn (March 12, 1917–February 2, 1971) was a U.S. actor who appeared in  Pretty Maids All in a Row as a board member and The Strawberry Statement as Professor. He also appeared on the television shows Dragnet, The Walter Winchell File 1957 episode "The Law and Aaron Benjamin"  and Perry Mason. He died of emphysema on May 20, 1974.

External links

1917 births
1971 deaths
American male film actors
American male television actors
Deaths from emphysema
20th-century American male actors